Railway stations in Uganda include:

Towns served by rail

Existing 

  Bungoma - last town in Kenya
  Malaba
   (border)
  Tororo - near Kenya border; junction for north line
 Main Line
 Iganga
 Jinja - bridge over Victoria Nile ; copper smelter
 Iganga - washed away culvert (2008)
 Busembatia
 Kampala  - national capital
 Kamwenge
 Kasese - railhead in southwest; cement works ; copper mine

 Branch line from Kampala
 Port Bell - port on Lake Victoria

 North Line
  Tororo - junction
 Mbale
 Kumi
 Aloi
 Soroti 
 Lira
 Gulu, Lira and Gulu.
 Pakwach - port in north west on Albert Nile
 Arua - railway does/used to extend to here.

 Nalukolongo - workshops
 Kilembe - copper mine

Proposed 
(connection to South Sudan - South to North)

  Lamu - port
  Garissa - river town
  Tororo, Uganda
  Malaba - junction
  Pakwach - river port on White Nile
  Gulu

  Kampala - capital
  Malaba - junction
   Nimule, South Sudan - border 
  Juba - national capital 
  Waw - river port on Jur River - break of gauge with Sudan

 Westwards from Kasese to  Kisangani in the Democratic Republic of Congo;
 Northwards from Gulu to Nimule, continuing to  Juba in South Sudan;
 North-eastwards from Pakwach to  Juba in the Sudan, continuing to Wau;
 Southwards from Masaka to Biharamulo in Tanzania.



  Hoima - proposed oil refinery

Standard gauge

2017 
  
 Naivasha
 Narok
 Bomet
 Nyamira
 Kisumu
 Yala
 Mumias
 Malaba
   border.
 Tororo
 Butaleja
 Namutumba
 Iganga
 Luuka
 Mayuge
 Jinja
 Buikwe
 Mukono
 Wakiso
 Kampala districts.

2015 
 SG construction starts

2014 

 CRBC Deal 

 original proposal including train ferry across Lake Victoria
  Tanga, Tanzania - Ocean port
  Musoma - Lake Victoria port 

 revised proposal avoiding train ferry across Lake Victoria
 Tanga, Tanzania - Singida - Mutukula - Kampala

 Hub

Out of service 

 Busoga

See also 

 Railway stations in Sudan
 Railway stations in Kenya
 Transport in Uganda
 Lamu Port and Lamu-Southern Sudan-Ethiopia Transport Corridor

References

External links 
Maps
 UN Map
 UN Map East Africa
 UNHCR Atlas Map
 UNHCR

 
Railway stations
Railway stations